Maxie Abad is a Filipino retired international footballer, lawyer and triathlete.

Early life and education
Abad became involved in football as early as when he was on his second grade. It was during that time when a football coach invited him to report for training with the "Midgets B" team after he was seen playing football during recess time. He attended the University of the Philippines Diliman and obtained his law degree at the Ateneo de Manila Law School.

Football career
Abad played as a striker for the Philippines national football team from 1986 to 1996. He skippered the Philippine squad that participated at the first ASEAN Football Championship in 1996. At the club level, he played for numerous semi-professional clubs. He has trained with the youth team of Brescia, Italy.

Post-retirement
In 2002, Abad, Ricardo Venus and Monty Roxas established the Manila Soccer Academy. In 2014, he was reportedly working as director and chief legal counsel in an oil exploration and production company. Abad also became involved in triathlon being a member of the Polo Triathlon Team. He finished at the 2007 Ironman Western Australia and numerous Ironman 70.3 Philippines

Personal life
Maxie Abad is married and has three sons and one daughter as of 2014. Abad is of Italian descent and a fan of AC Milan.

References

Living people
Filipino people of Italian descent
Italian footballers
Filipino footballers
Filipino male triathletes
20th-century Filipino lawyers
Philippines international footballers
Association football forwards
University of the Philippines Diliman alumni
Ateneo de Manila University alumni
Year of birth missing (living people)